Expeditie Robinson: All Stars is the twenty-third season of the Dutch reality television series Expeditie Robinson. The season was filmed in Zanzibar, Tanzania and consists of 16 former contestants who've reached the semi-finals of their respective seasons return to compete for another shot of winning the title of Robinson and a prize of €25,000. The season was initially supposed to premiere on 10 March 2022 on Videoland but due to the controversies surrounding The Voice of Holland, the premiere date was pushed up and premiered on 24 February 2022 and now aired on RTL 4. Videoland however, will still air new episodes a week ahead of when it is broadcast on RTL 4.

Contestants

Challenges

Voting History

Notes

References

External links

Expeditie Robinson seasons
2022 Dutch television seasons